The 2010 Championship League was a professional non-ranking snooker tournament that was played from 4 January to 25 March 2010 at the Crondon Park Golf Club in Stock, England.

Marco Fu won in the final 3–2 against Mark Allen, and earned a place in the 2010 Premier League Snooker.

Prize fund
The breakdown of prize money for this year is shown below: 

Group 1–7
Winner: £3,000
Runner-up: £2,000
Semi-final: £1,000
Frame-win (league stage): £100
Frame-win (play-offs): £300
Winners group
Winner: £10,000
Runner-up: £5,000
Semi-final: £3,000
Frame-win (league stage): £200
Frame-win (play-offs): £300

Tournament total: £173,900

Group one
Group one matches were played on 4 and 5 January 2010. Stephen Maguire was the first player to qualify for the winners group.

Matches

Judd Trump 3–1 Ryan Day
Mark Selby 2–3 Ali Carter
Shaun Murphy 0–3 Stephen Maguire
John Higgins 0–3 Judd Trump
Ryan Day 2–3 Mark Selby
Ali Carter 3–0 Shaun Murphy
Stephen Maguire 3–2 John Higgins
Judd Trump 1–3 Mark Selby
Ryan Day 0–3 Ali Carter
Shaun Murphy 1–3 John Higgins
Mark Selby 3–2 John Higgins
Stephen Maguire 3–2 Ali Carter
Judd Trump 3–1 Stephen Maguire
Ryan Day 1–3 Shaun Murphy
Ali Carter 0–3 John Higgins
Mark Selby 3–1 Stephen Maguire
Judd Trump 3–1 Shaun Murphy
Ryan Day 2–3 John Higgins
Ryan Day 1–3 Stephen Maguire
Mark Selby 0–3 Shaun Murphy
Judd Trump 2–3 Ali Carter

Table

Play-offs

Group two
Group two matches were played on 6 and 7 January 2010. John Higgins was the second player to qualify for the winners group.

Matches

Ali Carter 3–1 John Higgins
Mark Selby 1–3 Judd Trump
Neil Robertson 0–3 Marco Fu
Ronnie O'Sullivan 3–2 Mark Selby
John Higgins 3–2 Neil Robertson
Judd Trump 3–0 Ali Carter
Marco Fu 0–3 Ronnie O'Sullivan
Mark Selby 3–0 Ali Carter
Judd Trump 1–3 John Higgins
Neil Robertson 3–0 Ronnie O'Sullivan
Ali Carter 3–1 Ronnie O'Sullivan
Marco Fu 3–1 John Higgins
Mark Selby 0–3 Marco Fu
Judd Trump 2–3 Neil Robertson
John Higgins 3–0 Ronnie O'Sullivan
Ali Carter 1–3 Marco Fu
Judd Trump 3–0 Ronnie O'Sullivan
Mark Selby 3–2 Neil Robertson
Ali Carter 3–0 Neil Robertson
Judd Trump 1–3 Marco Fu
Mark Selby 0–3 John Higgins

Table

Play-offs

Group three
Group three matches were played on 18 and 19 January 2010. Judd Trump was the third player to qualify for the winners group.

Matches

Ali Carter 1–3 Marco Fu
Judd Trump 3–1 Neil Robertson
Stephen Hendry 2–3 Mark Allen
Joe Perry 3–1 Ali Carter
Marco Fu 1–3 Judd Trump
Neil Robertson 3–2 Stephen Hendry
Mark Allen 3–2 Joe Perry
Ali Carter 0–3 Judd Trump
Marco Fu 3–1 Neil Robertson
Stephen Hendry 2–3 Joe Perry
Judd Trump 3–1 Joe Perry
Mark Allen 3–2 Neil Robertson
Ali Carter 3–0 Mark Allen
Marco Fu 3–1 Stephen Hendry
Neil Robertson 3–0 Joe Perry
Judd Trump 3–1 Mark Allen
Marco Fu 3–1 Joe Perry
Ali Carter 3–2 Stephen Hendry
Judd Trump 2–3 Stephen Hendry
Marco Fu 2–3 Mark Allen
Ali Carter 3–2 Neil Robertson

Table

Play-offs

Group four
Group four matches were played on 20 and 21 January 2010. Marco Fu was the fourth player to qualify for the winners group.

Matches

Mark Allen 0–3 Marco Fu
Ali Carter 1–3 Neil Robertson
Peter Ebdon 1–3 Mark Williams
Liang Wenbo 1–3 Mark Allen
Marco Fu 3–0 Ali Carter
Neil Robertson 0–3 Peter Ebdon
Mark Williams 0–3 Liang Wenbo
Mark Allen 3–2 Ali Carter
Marco Fu 2–3 Neil Robertson
Peter Ebdon 3–1 Liang Wenbo
Ali Carter 2–3 Liang Wenbo
Mark Williams 1–3 Neil Robertson
Mark Allen 0–3 Mark Williams
Marco Fu 3–1 Peter Ebdon
Neil Robertson 3–1 Liang Wenbo
Ali Carter 2–3 Mark Williams
Marco Fu 3–2 Liang Wenbo
Mark Allen 3–2 Peter Ebdon
Ali Carter 0–3 Peter Ebdon
Marco Fu 0–3 Mark Williams
Mark Allen 1–3 Neil Robertson

Table

Play-offs

Group five
Group five matches were played on 8 and 9 February 2010. Mark Allen was to play in this group, but he moved to group six and was replaced by Ricky Walden.  Neil Robertson was the fifth player to qualify for the winners group.

Matches

Neil Robertson 3–1 Mark Williams
Peter Ebdon 3–0 Ricky Walden
Barry Hawkins 2–3 Jamie Cope
Dave Harold 1–3 Neil Robertson
Mark Williams 2–3 Peter Ebdon
Ricky Walden 3–2 Barry Hawkins
Jamie Cope 3–1 Dave Harold
Neil Robertson 2–3 Peter Ebdon
Mark Williams 3–2 Ricky Walden
Barry Hawkins 3–1 Dave Harold
Peter Ebdon 1–3 Dave Harold
Jamie Cope 3–0 Ricky Walden
Neil Robertson 3–2 Jamie Cope
Mark Williams 3–0 Barry Hawkins
Ricky Walden 3–0 Dave Harold
Peter Ebdon 2–3 Jamie Cope
Mark Williams 3–1 Dave Harold
Neil Robertson 2–3 Barry Hawkins
Peter Ebdon 2–3 Barry Hawkins
Mark Williams 3–2 Jamie Cope
Neil Robertson 3–2 Ricky Walden

Table

Play-offs

Group six
Group six matches are played on 10 and 11 February 2010. Mark Allen was the sixth player to qualify for the winners group.

Matches

Jamie Cope 0–3 Mark Williams
Peter Ebdon 3–0 Barry Hawkins
Mark Allen 3–2 Stuart Bingham
Joe Swail 1–3 Jamie Cope
Mark Williams 1–3 Peter Ebdon
Barry Hawkins 1–3 Mark Allen
Stuart Bingham 1–3 Joe Swail
Jamie Cope 3–2 Peter Ebdon
Mark Williams 3–0 Barry Hawkins
Mark Allen 2–3 Joe Swail
Peter Ebdon 3–1 Joe Swail
Stuart Bingham 3–2 Barry Hawkins
Jamie Cope 0–3 Stuart Bingham
Mark Williams 0–3 Mark Allen
Barry Hawkins 0–3 Joe Swail
Peter Ebdon 3–2 Stuart Bingham
Mark Williams 1–3 Joe Swail
Jamie Cope 3–2 Mark Allen
Peter Ebdon 2–3 Mark Allen
Mark Williams 3–0 Stuart Bingham
Jamie Cope 2–3 Barry Hawkins

Table

Play-offs

Group seven
Group seven matches were played on 22 and 23 March 2010. Jamie Cope was the seventh player to qualify for the winners group.

Matches

Peter Ebdon 3–1 Joe Swail
Mark Williams 3–0 Jamie Cope
Ding Junhui 3–0 Steve Davis
Michael Holt 1–3 Peter Ebdon
Joe Swail 0–3 Mark Williams
Jamie Cope 0–3 Ding Junhui
Steve Davis 1–3 Michael Holt
Peter Ebdon 3–2 Mark Williams
Joe Swail 0–3 Jamie Cope
Ding Junhui 1–3 Michael Holt
Mark Williams 3–0 Michael Holt
Steve Davis 0–3 Jamie Cope
Peter Ebdon 3–2 Steve Davis
Joe Swail 1–3 Ding Junhui
Jamie Cope 3–2 Michael Holt
Mark Williams 3–0 Steve Davis
Joe Swail 3–0 Michael Holt
Peter Ebdon 3–1 Ding Junhui
Mark Williams 3–2 Ding Junhui
Joe Swail 1–3 Steve Davis
Peter Ebdon 1–3 Jamie Cope

Table

Play-offs

Winners group
The matches of the winners group were played on 24 and 25 March 2010. Marco Fu has qualified for the 2010 Premier League.

Matches

Stephen Maguire 2–3 John Higgins
Judd Trump 2–3 Marco Fu
Neil Robertson 2–3 Mark Allen
Jamie Cope 1–3 Stephen Maguire
John Higgins 2–3 Judd Trump
Marco Fu 0–3 Neil Robertson
Mark Allen 3–2 Jamie Cope
Stephen Maguire 3–0 Judd Trump
John Higgins 1–3 Marco Fu
Neil Robertson 3–2 Jamie Cope
Judd Trump 3–0 Jamie Cope
Mark Allen 3–0 Marco Fu
Stephen Maguire 3–2 Mark Allen
John Higgins 1–3 Neil Robertson
Marco Fu 3–0 Jamie Cope
Judd Trump 0–3 Mark Allen
John Higgins 0–3 Jamie Cope
Stephen Maguire 3–2 Neil Robertson
Judd Trump 2–3 Neil Robertson
John Higgins 3–2 Mark Allen
Stephen Maguire 3–0 Marco Fu

Table

Play-offs

Century breaks
Total: 94

 144, 141, 139, 130, 122, 114, 102, 102, 101, 101  Peter Ebdon
 144, 134, 133, 130, 122, 120, 111, 110, 104, 104, 104, 103  Marco Fu
 143, 135, 117, 104, 104  Mark Williams
 142  Barry Hawkins
 140, 118, 110, 101, 101  Stephen Maguire
 138  John Higgins
 138  Ronnie O'Sullivan
 137, 131, 112, 109  Ding Junhui
 136, 136, 127, 110, 110  Ali Carter
 135, 131, 122, 116, 116, 115, 113, 113, 111, 110, 105, 104, 103, 101, 100, 100, 100  Neil Robertson
 133, 113, 105, 102, 102, 100, 100  Jamie Cope
 133  Ricky Walden
 131, 128, 122  Mark Selby
 124, 110  Stuart Bingham
 118, 110, 108, 107, 107, 106, 104, 103, 102, 101, 100  Judd Trump
 114, 107, 103, 100, 100  Mark Allen
 112, 109  Shaun Murphy
 106  Stephen Hendry
 101  Joe Perry

Winnings 

Green: Won the group. All prize money in GBP.

Source=Championship League Snooker by Matchroom Sport

References

External links

Championship League
Championship League
Championship League